Ross Hamilton was a member of the Virginia General Assembly, in the United States, serving as a representative of Mecklenburg County in the Virginia House of Delegates from 1869 to 1882, and 1889–1991.

He was a Republican.

See also
 African-American officeholders during and following the Reconstruction era

References

Year of birth missing
Year of death missing
19th-century American politicians
Members of the Virginia House of Delegates
People from Mecklenburg County, Virginia